Color Robot Battle is a programming game developed by Glenn Sogge and Del Ogren for the TRS-80 Color Computer and published by Radio Shack in 1981.

Robot Programming

The aim of the game is to write a computer program that controls a (simulated) robot. Two programs are selected to do battle in an arena with the last robot standing being the winner. One of the examples from the manual follows:

 *OMEGA
 ROB> =R:XM
 WAL> =W:T-2
 START> CROB:CWAL:F8:=?:T1
 GSTART

The robot controlled by this program follows the wall of the arena making an occasional random turn to break the movement pattern. The program scans for an opponent and attacks if one is found.

See also
RobotWar

References

External links 
 Color Robot Battle on the Programming Games Wiki
 Core Robot Battle: Adventures in Programming
 Tandy/TRS-80 Color Computer Robot Battle
 

1981 video games
TRS-80 Color Computer games
TRS-80 Color Computer-only games
Programming games
Video games about robots
Video games developed in the United States